The International Baseball Centre (IBC) is the home field of the Ashbourne Baseball Club and the Irish National Baseball Team.  It opened in 2015. It is Ireland's only international standard baseball diamond.

The IBC is the host field for the International Baseball Festival, an annual international baseball tournament held in Ashbourne. The crowning moment for the IBC was it being the host field for a tournament in the 2019 European Baseball Championship - Qualification held in Ireland in 2018.

International Baseball Festival 
The International Baseball Festival is an annual baseball tournament held at the International Baseball Centre.  The first tournament was held in 2015.  The Irish National Baseball Team has competed in every tournament since inception in preparation for International Play.  Past competing teams have come from Belgium, Mexico, the Netherlands, Spain, Venezuela and the USA.

2019 European Baseball Championship Qualifications 
The International Baseball Centre was the host field for a C-Pool qualification tournament for the 2019 European Baseball Championships.  Tournament dates were July 23rd - 29th, 2018.  National teams competing included Greece, Slovenia, Finland and Norway. The Irish National Team won the gold medal and advanced to the next round of Olympic qualifying.

References 

Baseball in Ireland